Agyneta equestris is a species of sheet weaver found in Central Europe and Ukraine. It was described by L. Koch in 1881.

References 

equestris
Spiders described in 1881
Spiders of Europe